Desolation or Desolate may refer to:

Loneliness

Geography 
Cape Desolation, a headland in southwest Greenland
Desolate Branch, a stream in West Virginia
Desolation Canyon, a canyon in Utah
Desolation Island (disambiguation)
Desolation Peak (disambiguation)
Desolation Sound, a sound in British Columbia
Desolation Wilderness, a protected area in California

Music 
Desolate (album), a 1995 album by Alien Faktor
Desolate (EP), a 2011 EP by Set The Sun
"Desolation", song by Granville Bantock from Songs from the Chinese Poets
"Desolation", a song by Tremonti from A Dying Machine

Other 
Desolation (2017 film), an American horror film
Desolation (2018 film), an American thriller film
Desolate (film), a 2018 American thriller film
Desolation (Llimona), a sculpture by Josep Llimona
Desolate (video game), a 2019 video game
Spiritual dryness, a concept in Catholic spirituality also known as desolation